Vitaliy Mishchenko (born August 26, 1975) is a Ukrainian former footballer who played in the Ukrainian Premier League, Ukrainian First League, Ukrainian Second League, and the Canadian Soccer League.

Playing career 
Mishchenko began his career in 1993 with FC CSKA Kyiv in the Ukrainian Second League. That same season he was loaned to FC Nyva Myronivka appearing in five matches. In 1994, he was loaned to PFC Sumy, and helped the club achieve promotion to the Ukrainian First League. In 1995, he signed with Obolon Kyiv, and helped the club win two league titles as well as a promotion to the Ukrainian Premier League. He also had two loan spells with FC Krasyliv during the 2002-2003, and 2003-2004 seasons. In 2006, he went overseas to sign with North York Astros of the Canadian Soccer League.

References 

1975 births
Living people
Ukrainian footballers
FC CSKA Kyiv players
FC Nyva Myronivka players
FC Ahrotekhservis Sumy players
FC Obolon-Brovar Kyiv players
FC Krasyliv players
North York Astros players
Ukrainian Premier League players
Canadian Soccer League (1998–present) players
Association football midfielders
Ukrainian First League players
Ukrainian Second League players